Inverness County is an historical county and census division of Nova Scotia, Canada. Local government is provided by the Municipality of the County of Inverness, the town of Port Hawkesbury and the Whycocomagh 2 Waycobah First Nation reserve.

History
Established as the County of Juste au Corps in 1835, Inverness County was given its present name in 1837. It was named after Sir Cameron Inverness of Scotland, the land from which many of the early settlers came. Agriculture and fishing dominated the economy with exports of butter and cattle to Newfoundland and Halifax for most of the nineteenth century. The construction of the Inverness and Richmond Railway in 1901, and the subsequent opening of coal mines at Port Hood, Mabou, and Inverness, created the "only home market" local farmers had ever had.

The boundaries of Inverness County had been previously defined when Cape Breton Island was divided by statute into three districts in 1823. In 1996, the county was amalgamated into a single municipality with the exception of Port Hawkesbury.

Demographics 

Population trend

Native language (2011)

Ethnic groups (2006)

Transport

Highways

Trunk Routes

Cabot Trail

Collector Routes:

See also
Cabot Trail: scenic route which passes through the area
Communities in Inverness County
List of municipalities in Nova Scotia
People from Inverness County

References

External links